Lyytikäinen is a Finnish surname.

Geographical distribution
As of 2014, 96.4% of all known bearers of the surname Lyytikäinen were residents of Finland (frequency 1:3,086), 2.2% of Sweden (1:240,165) and 1.2% of Estonia (1:57,464).

In Finland, the frequency of the surname was higher than national average (1:3,086) in the following regions:
 1. Southern Savonia (1:536)
 2. South Karelia (1:963)
 3. Northern Savonia (1:1,217)
 4. Kymenlaakso (1:2,163)
 5. Päijänne Tavastia (1:2,190)
 6. North Karelia (1:2,766)
 7. Central Finland (1:2,911)

People
 Ville Lyytikäinen (1967–2016), Finnish football coach
 Jaana Lyytikäinen (born 1982), Finnish footballer

References

Finnish-language surnames
Surnames of Finnish origin